Munksund Skuthamn SK (abbreviated as MSSK) is a Swedish football club located in Munksund, Piteå.

Background
Munksund Skuthamn SK currently plays in Division 4 Norrbotten Södra which is the sixth tier of Swedish football. They play their home matches at the Idrottsparken, Munksund in Piteå.

The club is affiliated to Norrbottens Fotbollförbund. MSSK also run a successful ladies ice-hockey section and the ladies first team plays in the Riksserien 2011–12.

Season to season

Footnotes

External links

 Munksund Skuthamn SK – Official website
 Munksund Skuthamn SK on Facebook

Sport in Norrbotten County
Football clubs in Norrbotten County